They Make Beer Commercials Like This is the third EP released by the band Minus the Bear on the Arena Rock Recording Co. After being remastered, it was re-released on June 3, 2008 through Suicide Squeeze Records with an added track, "Houston, We Have Uh-Oh". This song was originally released on the compilation, In Honor: A Compilation To Beat Cancer.

Reception

Reviews for the EP have been mixed. AllMusic praised its complexity and "constantly shifting, tricky rhythms". Both AllMusic and Pitchfork commented on the band's pattern of creating playfully odd titles for songs that are completely serious, but Pitchfork considered this a negative, and additionally criticized the lack of any progression in the band's music over their years of existence. They marked "Dog Park" and "Pony Up" as strong tracks, and concluded "The prevalence of so much filler on a six-song EP is discouraging, and marks this EP as just another placeholder in a career long sustained primarily by placeholder EPs."

Track listing

Personnel
Minus the Bear
Jake Snider - Vocals & Guitar
Dave Knudson - Guitar
Erin Tate - Drums
Cory Murchy - Bass
Matt Bayles - Electronics

Other personnel
Additional vocals from Heather Duby on the track "I'm Totally Not Down With Rob's Alien"
Recorded and Mixed by Matt Bayles
Mastered by Ed Brooks

Trivia
The song title "Houston, We Have Uh-Oh" was taken from an episode of Sealab 2021 titled "Vacation."
Some copies bore a sticker on the cover that stated "Pronounced with an 'Umpty'".

References

External links
Arena Rock Recording Co.
Suicide Squeeze Records

2004 EPs
Minus the Bear albums
Arena Rock Recording Company EPs
Suicide Squeeze Records albums